Spatial politics refers to the use of spatial terms to simplify and dramatize political differences and actions.

Thus left-wing politics oppose right-wing politics -- after the seating habits on the left and right sides of French assemblies in the late 18th century. 

Also from France comes the political grouping known as The Mountain - originally the occupants of higher seats in a chamber.

The British Westminster tradition of parliamentary debate involves rows of benches facing each other in a confrontational manner. Some see this as discouraging consensus and compromise.

While the opposing Members of Parliament may well espouse mutually opposed left-wing and right-wing views, the official division lies not between left and right but between Government and Opposition, with everyone aiming to sit on the Government side, and individuals often hoping to move in their careers from the back benches to the front benches - occupied by the leadership of each faction.

Members falling out with their fellows on some issue cross the floor to vote with their erstwhile political enemies.

Note that some modern parliaments, such as the German Bundestag, attempt to de-polarise extremes by seating arrangements.

Church politics sometimes employ a different spatial paradigm: Low Church contrasts with High Church. Continuing the vertical theme, a church party may get dubbed Ultramontane.

Political science theories